Cabell is both a surname and a given name. The Cabell family has "been prominent in Virginia since the American Revolution." Notable people with the name include:

Surname:
 Charles P. Cabell (1903–1971), United States Air Force, CIA
 Earle Cabell (1906–1975), politician from Texas
 Edward Carrington Cabell (1816–1896), politician from Florida
 Elizabeth Cabell (granddaughter of William Cabell (American Revolution) and mother of Albert Cabell Ritchie)
 Enos Cabell (born 1949), Major League Baseball player
 George Cabell (1766–1823), physician from Virginia
 George Craighead Cabell (1836–1906), United States Congressman from Virginia
 James Branch Cabell (1879–1958), American author of fantasy fiction
 James Laurence Cabell (1813–1889), sanitarian
 Mary Barnes Cabell (1815-1900), freedwoman who owned the land which became Institute, West Virginia
 Nicole Cabell (born 1977), opera singer
 Samuel Jordan Cabell (1756–1818), United States Congressman from Virginia
 William Cabell (disambiguation), one of several people with this name, including:
 William Cabell Bruce (1860–1946), United States Senator from Maryland and author
 William Cabell (American Revolution) (1730–1798), a figure in the American Revolution
 William H. Cabell (1772–1853), Governor of Virginia
 William Lewis Cabell (1827–1911), Confederate General and Mayor of Dallas
 William Cabell Rives (1793–1868), American statesman from Virginia

Given name:
 Cabell R. Berry (1848–1910), Speaker of the Tennessee State Senate from 1885 to 1887
 John Cabell Breckinridge (1821–1875), 14th Vice President of the United States
 John Cabell "Bunny" Breckinridge (1903–1996), American actor
 Cab Calloway (1907–1994), American jazz singer and bandleader
 Clement Cabell Dickinson (1849–1938), United States Congressman from Missouri
 Albert Cabell Ritchie (1876–1936), 49th Governor of Maryland
 Marion Cabell Tyree, author of the community cookbook called Housekeeping in Old Virginia, which contains the oldest known recipe for sweet ice tea, published in 1879

See also 
 Cabell County, West Virginia
 Cabell City, Oregon
Cabell Publishing
 The Putnam-Cabell Post
 Cable (disambiguation)
 Cabel, a surname

References